Paromius is a genus of dirt-colored seed bugs in the family Rhyparochromidae. There are about 15 described species in Paromius.

Species
These 15 species belong to the genus Paromius:

 Paromius apicatus (Stal, 1855)
 Paromius attenuatus (Dallas, 1852)
 Paromius australis Malipatil, 1978
 Paromius carvalhoi Slater, 1995
 Paromius dohrnii (Guerin-Meneville, 1857)
 Paromius excelsus Bergroth, 1924
 Paromius exiguus (Distant, 1883)
 Paromius gracilis (Rambur, 1839)
 Paromius jejunus (Distant, 1883)
 Paromius limbatus (Stal, 1874)
 Paromius longulus (Dallas, 1852)
 Paromius paraclypeatus Scudder, 1969
 Paromius piratoides (Costa, 1864)
 Paromius procerula (Berg, 1892)
 Paromius trivialis (Stal, 1874)

References

Rhyparochromidae
Articles created by Qbugbot
Pentatomomorpha genera